Coast Guard Air Station Traverse City was established in 1946 and operates under the authority of the United States Coast Guard's Ninth District (USCG). It is situated on the southern end of Grand Traverse Bay in Northern Michigan at the Cherry Capital Airport in Traverse City, Michigan, United States. Since 1995, Air Station Traverse City has controlled and staffed Air Facilities throughout southern Lake Michigan. The area of operations includes all of Lake Michigan and Lake Superior and most of Lake Huron.

History 

Originally established as a one-plane detachment to provide Search and Rescue service to the Great Lakes, Coast Guard Air Station Traverse City was commissioned in 1945. Over the years, the Air Station has grown from its original small complement to its present staff size of 20 officers and 100 enlisted personnel. Along with changes in size, the air station has experienced changes in the types of aircraft assigned over the years. The Consolidated PBY-5A "Catalina" gave way to the Grumman HU-16 "Albatross" seaplane and, eventually, the Dassault HU-25 Falcon. Likewise, the Sikorsky HO4S/3G (or H-19 "Chickasaw") helicopter gave way to the Sikorsky HH-52 "Seaguard" helicopter.

In 1961, Air Station H-19 helicopters assisted in the evacuation of the crew of the Francisco Morazán, an operation that lasted four days in continuous gale conditions. Crews also rescued 25 survivors of the collision between the Cedarville and the Topdalsfjord in 1965, and 19 survivors from the fire aboard the Canadian freighter Cartiercliffe Hall in 1979.

Proving their versatility, air station personnel have participated in a variety of other operations. In 1986, a premature baby boy was delivered aboard an HU-25 during an air evacuation (AIREVAC) from Alpena to Traverse City, Michigan. The same year, another Falcon aircraft reported to Patrick AFB, Florida to assist in the recovery search for Space Shuttle Challenger.

Later in 1986, the rescue capabilities of the "Seaguard" helicopter and the patrol capabilities of the "Falcon" jet were combined in the Sikorsky HH-3F "Pelican" helicopter. At that time, Traverse City became a helicopter-only unit operating three HH-3F helicopters.

Since 1995, Air Station Traverse City has controlled and staffed air facilities throughout southern Lake Michigan. On April 1, 1995, Air Station Chicago transitioned to Air Facility Glenview at the former Naval Air Station Glenview, Illinois and fell under operational control of Air Station Traverse City. However, its colors were retired soon after on November 15, 1996, and the facility ceased operations concurrent with the closure of NAS Glenview due to BRAC action. On April 1, 1997, Air Facility Muskegon was established and with one HH-65A from Traverse City. But on May 25, 2000, Air Facility Waukegan was established, and Air Station Traverse City slowly transferred operations there. On September 30, 2001, Air Station Traverse City completely transferred Air Facility Muskegon to Air Station Detroit at Selfridge Air National Guard Base, Michigan and took control of Air Facility Waukegan.

Both air facilities operate from Memorial Day to Labor Day.

The air station transitioned from four MH-65D to three MH-60T in April 2017.

Aircraft operated 
 Transitioned from four MH-65 Dolphin Helicopters to three Sikorsky MH-60T Jayhawk helicopters in April 2017.

References

External links 
 http://www.uscg.mil/History/stations/airsta_traversecity.html

Traverse City, Michigan
United States Coast Guard Air Stations

de:Coast Guard Air Station